
Gmina Rydzyna is an urban-rural gmina (administrative district) in Leszno County, Greater Poland Voivodeship, in west-central Poland.

Villages
Apart from the town of Rydzyna, Gmina Rydzyna contains the villages and settlements of Augustowo, Dąbcze, Jabłonna, Junoszyn, Kaczkowo, Kłoda, Lasotki, Maruszewo, Moraczewo, Nowawieś, Nowy Świat, Pomykowo, Przybina, Robczysko, Rojęczyn, Tarnowałąka, Tworzanice and Tworzanki.

Neighbouring gminas
Gmina Rydzyna is bordered by the city of Leszno and by the gminas of Bojanowo, Góra, Krzemieniewo, Osieczna, Poniec and Święciechowa.

References
Polish official population figures 2006

Rydzyna
Leszno County